Argenti is an Italian surname. Notable people with the surname include:

 Nicholas Argenti (1896–1961), British stockbroker
 Giosuè Argenti (1819–1901), Italian sculptor
 Christian Argenti (born 1975), Australian singer and radio presenter
 Filippo Argenti (13th century), politician and citizen of Florence

See also
 Museo degli Argenti, better known as Palazzo Pitti, in Florence, Italy

Italian-language surnames